Thomas Clancy (11 April 1887 – 23 April 1957) was an Australian rules footballer who played for South Melbourne, Carlton and Collingwood in the Victorian Football League (VFL).

Football
Clancy could manage only one appearance at South Melbourne in 1908 after being recruited from the local Leopold team. He transferred to Williamstown in the VFA before clearances closed at the end of June and played 8 games without kicking a goal for 'Town in 1908 and 1909.

He resurrected his career when he came to Carlton and he was a regular in their team from 1910 to 1914.

Clancy was a losing Grand Finalist in his first year at the club and when he was not picked in their side for the 1914 premiership decider, owing to a disagreement with the coach, he left and joined Collingwood.

He participated in the 1915 Grand Final with Collingwood, in his favourite position of wingman but again finished on the losing team.

Notes

References
Holmesby, Russell and Main, Jim (2007). The Encyclopedia of AFL Footballers. 7th ed. Melbourne: Bas Publishing.

External links

1887 births
Australian rules footballers from Victoria (Australia)
Players of Australian handball
Sydney Swans players
Carlton Football Club players
Collingwood Football Club players
Williamstown Football Club players
1957 deaths